The National League (named Vanarama National League for sponsorship reasons) is an association football league in England consisting of three divisions, the National League, National League North, and National League South. It was called the "Alliance Premier League" from 1979 until 1986. Between 1986 and 2015, the league was known as the "Football Conference". 

Most National League clubs are fully professional (only three are not in the 2022/23 lineup), while a growing number of National League North and National League South clubs are also professional. Some professional clubs were previously in the English Football League (EFL), as opposed to clubs that have always been non-League. The National League is the lowest of the five nationwide professional football divisions in England, below the Premier League and the three divisions of the EFL, and is the top tier of the National League System of non-League football. The National League North and National League South form the sixth tier of professional English football. The National League consisted of only one division until 2004, but expanded as part of an extensive restructuring of the National League System beginning with the 2004–05 season.

Organisation
The National League stands at the top of the National League System (NLS), a comprehensive structure linking together over 50 different leagues under the auspices of The Football Association (FA). The National League is at Step 1 of the NLS, and National League North and National League South make up Step 2. Above the National League are the 92 clubs that together make up the highest levels of English football, the Premier League and the EFL; below the National League are the Step 3 and lower leagues of the NLS.

The National League has 24 clubs and the North and South divisions have 22 clubs each. Each club plays the others in its division twice during a season, once at home and once away. Clubs earn three points for a win, one for a draw, and none for a defeat.

At the end of each season two clubs are promoted from the National League to EFL League Two and two teams from League Two are relegated to the National League to take their place. The two promotion places are awarded to the National League champions and to the winners of the National League Promotion Final, which is played between the two teams who were successful in playoff games, contested by those clubs finishing second to seventh in the final divisional standings.

At the other end of the table, the bottom four clubs in National League are relegated to either National League North or National League South. The decision as to which division the relegated club joins is made by the FA's NLS Committee, but is largely determined by geography. The four relegated teams are replaced by four promoted teams, two from National League North and two from National League South. For each of these two leagues, this is the champions and the winners of their respective Promotion Finals between their second to seventh place clubs in those divisions.

At the bottom of National League North and National League South, three clubs from each division are relegated and these six clubs are divided among the Step 3 leagues of the NLS, the Northern Premier League, the Southern League, and the Isthmian League. Each of these Step 3 leagues promotes their respective champions and second- to fifth-place playoff winners. The NLS Committee determines which Step 3 leagues the relegated clubs join, and whether the promoted clubs join National League North or National League South.

Clubs relegated from the national division are not always geographically balanced. Thus, should it be deemed necessary, the NLS Committee may order one or more clubs from northern counties bordering the south and vice versa or from South Wales in the sixth tier to switch divisions (to move "horizontally" between the leagues, so to speak) so as to maintain numerical balance between North and South.

Due to financial constraints at this level of football, some clubs have escaped relegation despite finishing in a relegation position, due to the misfortune of others. For promotion to proceed, whether from the National League to the EFL, within the National League, or between the various leagues of the NLS, certain conditions concerning finances and facilities must be met. Failure to meet the requirements of the league concerned prevents the eligible club from being promoted.

The National League North and South expanded to 24 teams each in the 2022–23 season. Expansion was scheduled at first for 2020–21 until its implementation was postponed because of the COVID-19 pandemic in England. It was fulfilled at the end of 2021–22.

History
The National League was formed in 1979 from leading teams in the Northern Premier League and Southern League and was originally known as the Alliance Premier Football League and subsequently the Football Conference. Support for such a league came from Alan Hardaker, the long serving Secretary of the Football League. He suggested that an amalgamation of the two strongest lower leagues in England, the Northern Premier League and the Southern League, would reduce the number of candidates applying to join the Football League under the re-election system then in use. It was also thought it would enable the strongest non-league candidate to emerge. In 1977 the Northern Premier and Southern Leagues agreed to only put forward one candidate each for election to the League and this proved successful with Wimbledon and Wigan Athletic gaining election to the League in 1977 and 1978. It was then agreed that a new league would be set up comprising 13 Southern League teams and 7 sides from the Northern Premier. 

The founder members were:

Several Northern Premier sides who might have taken part in the new competition did not do so. Goole Town, Lancaster City, and Mossley all did not apply to enter the Alliance. Matlock Town and Runcorn were not admitted as their grounds did not meet the criteria required for the new league. Southport, who had been voted out of the Football League in 1978, were accepted as members of the new league, but eventually chose not to join it due to concerns over travelling costs. 

Barrow and Northwich had previously been members of the EFL. Barrow failed re-election in 1972, while Northwich resigned from the league in 1894. Barnet, Boston, Maidstone, Scarborough and Yeovil have also tasted EFL football since the formation of the National League, but are now back in the National League or its feeder leagues (Scarborough and Maidstone now in new incarnations).

Of the 20 founder members, the last to leave the fifth level were Northwich. They were relegated in 2005, a year after the demise of Telford. Barnet are the only founder member who have remained in the top five levels continuously since 1979.

Bangor City have since moved to the Welsh football league system, while AP Leamington, Maidstone, Nuneaton, Scarborough, and Telford later collapsed and were reconstituted in lower English leagues. Gravesend & Northfleet changed its name to Ebbsfleet United in 2007.

The National League had a single division for the first 25 years of its existence, but since the 2004–05 season has consisted of three divisions. The original division was renamed Conference National (currently National League) and two new regional divisions one level down were introduced, Conference North and Conference South (currently National League North and South). The new clubs to form this larger competition were drawn from the Northern Premier League, Southern League, and Isthmian League according to guidelines developed by the NLS Committee.

Two teams have won the National League three times: Barnet (1991, 2005, 2015) and Macclesfield Town (1995, 1997, 2018). Prior to Barnet's and Macclesfield's third title wins, five other clubs had also become champions twice: Altrincham (1980, 1981), Enfield (1983, 1986), Kidderminster Harriers (1994, 2000), Maidstone United, (1984, 1989), and Stevenage Borough (1996, 2010). Kidderminster also finished second in 1997 and 2013. Lincoln City became the seventh club to win the National League twice (1988, 2017), but subsequent to Barnet's third title. Only Barnet were promoted to the EFL on all three occasions; Maidstone's first title came before the era of automatic promotion, while Kidderminster Harriers, Macclesfield Town and Stevenage Borough were denied promotion because their grounds were not up to the required standard at the time of their first win. However, all three were promoted when they took their second title. Altrincham are the only team in history to retain the title, as at the time there was no automatic promotion to the EFL.

No former National League club has yet reached the Premier League, although six such clubs did compete in the top tier of football prior to the Premier League, in the Football League First Division: Carlisle United, Leyton Orient, Oxford United, Luton Town, Grimsby Town, and Notts County. The first five of them have since returned to the League, Luton and Orient by winning the title, and the other three by winning the playoff finals. Additionally Luton Town and Oxford United and also Grimsby Town and Notts County are the only clubs to have played league matches against each other in all top five tiers of English football. Bradford (Park Avenue) also played in the First Division in its previous incarnation, however their current incarnation has only reached as high as the National North division.

The highest league tier a club promoted from the National League has reached is the second-tier EFL Championship, which (as of August 2021) has been reached by six clubs: Colchester United, Doncaster Rovers, Yeovil Town, Luton Town, Burton Albion and Wycombe Wanderers. Colchester, Doncaster and Luton were EFL members before competing in the National League, while Yeovil, Burton and Wycombe were entirely new to EFL football.

Oldham Athletic became the first former Premier League side to compete in the National League and by extension, any non-League competition, following a home defeat by Salford City, in 2022.

Promotion and relegation
Prior to 1987, for National League clubs to enter the EFL, they had to be elected by League members. As a consequence, there was no guarantee that winning the National League would result in promotion, and none of the league's first eight champions were promoted. This changed in 1987, when automatic promotion and relegation between the Football League Fourth Division and the National League was agreed. The first clubs affected by the new system were Lincoln City, who were relegated and replaced by Scarborough. However, although the champions of the National League are entitled to a place in the EFL, this was dependent on their stadium meeting the set criteria for membership. This meant that Northampton Town, Exeter City, and Torquay United all avoided relegation from the EFL, although Exeter and Torquay were both relegated to the National League at a later date.

For three successive years in the 1990s, the National League champions were denied promotion to the EFL on these grounds. Since 1997, when Macclesfield Town won the title for the second time in three years, every champion has been promoted.

Since 2003, the National League has been awarded a second promotion place. Through 2017, this was decided by a play-off system similar to that of the EFL. The four teams below the National League champions played against each other in semi-finals over two legs, with second playing fifth and third playing fourth. The winners of these ties then played a single final game known as the Promotion Final, with the winners gaining the second promotion place. Doncaster Rovers were the first team to win the Promotion Final. 

Prior to 2004, relegation from the National League meant dropping to one of the three feeder leagues below. After Chester City failed to avoid expulsion in 2010, three teams were relegated instead of four, to either the Northern Premier League, Southern League or Isthmian League, based on geographical criteria. In turn, the champions of these three leagues would be promoted to the National League. The closure of Chester City during the later stages of the 2009–10 season was the first mid-season closure of a club in the division since Newport County in the second half of the 1988–89 season; on both occasions, the records of both clubs were expunged.

In 2004, a restructuring of the National League System saw the creation of a new level immediately below the National League; two regional divisions now named National League North and National League South were created, with the feeder leagues dropping below them. There are two promotion places to the National League's top division from each regional division – the champions are promoted automatically, while the remaining place is again decided by semi final play-offs and a Promotion Final. The four teams relegated from the National League (i.e. the highest division) are then allocated to one or other of the regional divisions dependent on their geographical location.

In May 2017, the National League proposed a revamp in the play-offs for all three divisions. Under the new system, the number of teams playing for promotion was increased to six. The clubs finishing second and third automatically proceed to a semi-final at their home ground, while the clubs in fourth and fifth stage compete in qualifying round ties against the teams finishing seventh and sixth. The winners of those matches then complete the semi-finals. These proposals were approved at the National League's annual general meeting on 10 June. 

In 2019, plans were discussed for the gradual restructuring of the NLS so that the North and South divisions were expected to expand to 24 teams each in 2021–22. Due to the COVID-19 pandemic in England, the 2020–21 National League North and South seasons were curtailed and voided after written resolutions were put to a vote. No teams were relegated. Expansion was therefore delayed and it was implemented before the 2022–23 season with eight-team relegations from tier six at the end of that season. To expand, two clubs in Step 2 were relegated and eight promoted from all four Step 3 divisions: the division champions and play-off winners. Four teams in both North and South are to be relegated starting in 2023.

Current members

National League
Aldershot Town
Altrincham
Barnet
Boreham Wood
Bromley
Chesterfield
Dagenham & Redbridge
Dorking Wanderers
Eastleigh
FC Halifax Town
Gateshead
Maidenhead United
Maidstone United
Notts County
Oldham Athletic
Scunthorpe United
Solihull Moors
Southend United
Torquay United
Wealdstone
Woking
Wrexham
Yeovil Town
York City

National League North
AFC Fylde
AFC Telford United
Alfreton Town
Banbury United
Blyth Spartans
Boston United
Brackley Town
Bradford (Park Avenue)
Buxton
Chester
Chorley
Curzon Ashton
Darlington
Farsley Celtic
Gloucester City
Hereford
Kettering Town
King's Lynn Town
Kidderminster Harriers
Leamington
Peterborough Sports
Scarborough Athletic
Southport
Spennymoor Town

National League South
Bath City
Braintree Town
Chelmsford City
Cheshunt
Chippenham Town
Concord Rangers
Dartford
Dover Athletic
Dulwich Hamlet
Eastbourne Borough
Ebbsfleet United
Farnborough
Hampton & Richmond Borough
Havant & Waterlooville
Hemel Hempstead Town
Hungerford Town
Oxford City
Slough Town
St Albans City
Taunton Town
Tonbridge Angels
Welling United
Weymouth
Worthing

Former National League clubs now in the EFL

Former EFL clubs now in the National League
Phoenix or reformed clubs are not included unless they competed in the League in their own right, and are counted separately from the original club. Highest English Football League tier is the tier's standing within the EFL and may not correspond to its overall standing on today's system.

Phoenix clubs
Several clubs formed as phoenix clubs after the dissolution of former EFL teams currently compete in the National League. These include:
 AFC Telford United (founded in 2004 following the winding-up of Telford United in 2004)
 Aldershot Town (founded in 1992 following the winding-up of Aldershot in 1992)
 Bradford (Park Avenue) (founded in 1987 following the winding-up of the original Bradford (Park Avenue) in 1974)
 Chester (founded in 2010 following the winding-up of Chester City in 2010)
 Darlington (founded in 2012 following the winding-up of the original Darlington in 2012)
 FC Halifax Town (founded in 2008 following the winding-up of Halifax Town in 2008)
 Gateshead (founded in 1977 following the winding-up of Gateshead in 1973)
 Hereford (founded in 2014 following the winding up of Hereford United in 2014)
 Maidstone United (founded in 1992 following the winding-up of Maidstone United in 1992)
 Scarborough Athletic (founded in 2007 following the winding-up of Scarborough in 2007)

Past National League winners

* Promoted to the EFL (Fourth Division until 1992, Third Division from 1992 until 2004 and League Two from 2004)** Not promoted

** Not promoted. In 2004–05 only three promotion places were available to the Conference Premier. The third place was decided in a Promotion Final at Stoke City's Britannia Stadium, which Eastbourne Borough lost 2–1 to the Conference North Playoff winners, Altrincham.

League Cup

The Alliance Premier/Conference organised a cup competition from 1979 until 2009, with occasional breaks when sponsors were not available. Known initially as the Bob Lord Challenge Trophy until 2000–01, the cup competition was reinstated in 2007–08 as the Conference League Cup, sponsored by Setanta Sports. Very much like the EFL Cup and EFL Trophy at the higher levels, it has not always proved popular with fans and was generally viewed as of secondary importance to the FA Trophy. The cup was put in abeyance when Setanta Sports' British service ceased.

Winners

Sponsorship
Since 1984, the National League has been publicly known by the names of a succession of official title sponsors. The name was officially changed from Alliance Premier to the Football Conference in 1986, and to the National League in 2015. Below is a list of sponsors and what they chose to call the league.

Media coverage
The National League's first major TV coverage was available on Setanta Sports. The channel showed 79 matches each season. It also showed the Conference League Cup. The FA Trophy Final was also shown on Setanta Sports (after being shown on Sky Sports until 2008). The channel's British operations went under in June 2009.

On 19 August 2010, Premier Sports announced that it had bought the live and exclusive UK television rights to thirty matches per season from the Conference Premier for a total of three seasons. The thirty matches selected for broadcast included all five Conference Premier matches culminating in the Promotion Final itself. The deal with the then-Football Conference was a revenue sharing arrangement whereby clubs received 50% of revenue from subscriptions, on top of the normal rights fee paid by the broadcaster, once the costs of production were met. The Conference also earned 50% from all internet revenue associated with the deal and allowed them to retain advertising rights allied to those adverts shown with their matches. During the 2010–11 season, Premier Sports failed to attract enough viewers to its Conference football broadcasts to share any revenue with the clubs beyond the £5,000 broadcast fee paid to home clubs and £1,000 to away clubs.

BT Sport are now one of the television broadcast partners and commenced a contract in 2013–14 to cover again up to 30 National league matches including the end of season semi finals and the Promotion Final. The deal worth £300,000, sees the fee to each home clubs as £7,000 and the away club £1,000. The National League also launched its own channel called NLTV, which focuses on all 68 member clubs across the three divisions.

See also
National League (division)
National League North
National League South

References

External links

 

 
5
Sports leagues established in 1979
1979 establishments in England
Professional sports leagues in the United Kingdom